Bheed is an upcoming Indian Hindi-language drama film written and directed and produced by Anubhav Sinha, set during the events of the 2020 COVID-19 lockdown in India. The story of this film was given by Anubhav Sinha, Saumya Tiwari and Sonali Jain. It’s the first collaboration of the star Rajkumar Rao and director Anubhav Sinha and it’s the first film of Rajkumar Rao in 2023.It stars Rajkummar Rao, Bhumi Pednekar, Dia Mirza, Ashutosh Rana, Pankaj Kapur and Kritika Kamra. Principal photography commenced in October 2021 and ended in January 2022. Bheed is set for a theatrical release on 24 March 2023.

Plot
Bheed is an account of the largest migration in India after the partition in 1947 which happened during the lockdown of 2020. It tells the story of how several characters in the film deal with the lockdown and migrate to a place they feel safe at.

Cast
 Rajkummar Rao 
 Bhumi Pednekar
 Dia Mirza
 Ashutosh Rana
 Pankaj Kapur
 Kritika Kamra
 Kumud Mishra
 Aditya Shrivastav
 Veerendra Saxena
 Mahesh Chandra Deva
 Shushil Pandey

Release 
The film was officially announced on 13 May 2022. The film's official Announcement video was released on 3rd March 2023.

References

External links